The Prison in Twelve Landscapes is a Canadian documentary film, directed by Brett Story and released in 2016. Consisting of twelve short vignettes, the film explores the social impact of the prison–industrial complex in the United States through various angles, including a former industrial town in Kentucky which is now dependent on a federal penitentiary for local employment, a community park which was constructed solely to prevent registered sex offenders from being able to move into the local halfway house, and a man who runs a business selling items to family members of prisoners for inclusion in care packages.

The film premiered at the True/False Film Festival in March 2016, and had its Canadian premiere at the Hot Docs Canadian International Documentary Festival in May.

Reception

Critical reception
The Prison in Twelve Landscapes holds a 100% approval rating on review aggregator website Rotten Tomatoes, based on 6 reviews, with a weighted average of 7.8/10. On Metacritic, the film holds a rating of 86 out of 100, based on 5 critics, indicating "universal acclaim".

Awards
At Hot Docs, the film was awarded a $5,000 Special Jury Citation in the Best Canadian Feature Documentary category.

At the Vancouver Film Critics Circle Awards 2016, the film won the award for Best Canadian Documentary.

The film received a Canadian Screen Award nomination at the 5th Canadian Screen Awards in 2017, for Best Feature Length Documentary.

References

External links
 

2016 films
2016 documentary films
Canadian documentary films
Documentary films about incarceration in the United States
Canadian anthology films
Canadian prison films
2010s English-language films
2010s Canadian films
2010s American films